A punt gun is a type of extremely large shotgun used in the 19th and early 20th centuries for shooting large numbers of waterfowl for commercial harvesting operations. These weapons are characteristically too large for an individual to fire from the shoulder or often carry alone, but unlike artillery pieces, punt guns are able to be aimed and fired by a single person from a mount.  In this case, the mount is typically a small watercraft (e.g. a punt).  Many early models appear similar to over-sized versions of shoulder weapons of the time with full-length wooden stocks with a normal-sized shoulder stock. Most later variations do away with the full-length stock — especially more modern models — and have mounting hardware fixed to the gun to allow them to be fitted to a pintle.

Operation and usage

Punt guns were usually custom-designed and varied widely, but could have bore diameters exceeding  and fire over a pound (≈ 0.45 kg) of shot at a time. A single shot could kill over 50 waterfowl resting on the water's surface. They were too big to hold and the recoil was so large that they had to be mounted directly on punts used for hunting, hence their name. Hunters would manoeuvre their punts quietly into line and range of the flock using poles or oars to avoid startling them. Generally, the gun was fixed to the punt; thus the hunter would manoeuvre the entire boat in order to aim the gun. The guns were sufficiently powerful, and the punts sufficiently small, that firing the gun often propelled the punt backwards several inches or more. To improve efficiency, hunters could work in fleets of up to around ten punts.

Punt guns are usually muzzle-loaded with a lock similar to muskets or rifles of the day including flintlock, percussion, and more modern types.  Holland & Holland offered models using breech loading and standardized shotgun shells in both brass and combined paper and brass base in the 1890s via custom order. Double-barreled models also existed, typically in the smaller 8-gauge loadings. In most cases, these guns were work-guns with little additional adornment in surviving examples. Many appearing in modern auctions have signs of being repaired or upgraded in some fashion, such as upgrading a flintlock action to a more modern percussion system or refinishing by rebluing the piece.

In the United States, this practice depleted stocks of wild waterfowl and by the 1860s most states had banned the practice. The Lacey Act of 1900 banned the transport of wild game across state lines, and the practice of market hunting was outlawed by a series of federal laws in 1918.  While use and possession of punt guns is still legal in the United States, Federal regulations prohibit their use in migratory waterfowl hunting.

According to Eunan O'Halpin's book Defending Ireland, a Local Defence Force unit of the Irish Army in Co. Louth was equipped in 1941 with a number of flintlock weapons that had been gifted to them. Among these guns was a weapon described as being a "nine-foot [long] blunderbuss", which could be more commonly understood to be a punt gun.

In the United Kingdom, a 1995 survey showed fewer than 50 active punt guns still in use. Since Queen Victoria's Diamond Jubilee in 1897 there has been a punt gun salute every Coronation and Jubilee over Cowbit Wash in Cowbit, Lincolnshire, England. During the Diamond Jubilee of Elizabeth II, 21 punt gun rounds were fired separately, followed by the guns all being fired simultaneously.

Fictional usage
Desmond Bagley's 1973 thriller, The Tightrope Men, features a percussion-fired punt gun. Although the book is set in northern Finland, punt guns were never used in the country.

In his 1978 novel Chesapeake, author James A. Michener details the historical use of various punt guns (described by him as "long guns") and their impact on waterfowl numbers.  One, called "The Twombly", was described as 11 feet 6 inches long, 110 pounds (with a load of 3/4 lbs of black powder and over 1.5 lbs of number 6 shot), which was used to hunt geese and ducks by the highlighted watermen of the Chesapeake Bay.

The 2004 film Tremors 4: The Legend Begins featured a punt gun used in combat. The weapon was not actually of this bore, instead being a large prop shell concealing a 12 gauge shotgun firing triple-loaded black powder blanks, with the barrel sprayed with WD-40 water displacer to produce a large smoke cloud on firing.

In the novel Outer Dark, by Cormac McCarthy, the use of a four-gauge punt gun for hunting ducks is described.

In the Discworld novel Pyramids, mention is made of a "Puntbow", essentially a combination of this weapon and a crossbow.

See also

Gauge conversion guide
Sneakbox, a small boat used for hunting waterfowl 
M18 Claymore mine, directional anti-personnel mine with similar effects to that said firearm.
Canister shot

Guns of similar size or application
Anti-materiel rifle
Anti-tank rifle
Jingal
Elephant gun
Wall gun
Organ gun
Volley gun
Zamburak
Java arquebus

References

External links
Article on punt gunning  at Wildfowling.com
Video showing a punt gun being fired at an array of clay pigeons
Royal Armouries wildfowling film clip

Shotguns
Bird hunting
Boat types